Detective Narada is a 1992 Telugu-language comedy film directed by Vamsy. It stars Mohan Babu and Mohini, with music composed by Ilaiyaraaja.

Plot
Narada is a private detective who is hired to solve the mystery behind Nirosha's pregnancy.

Cast
Mohan Babu as Narada
Mohini as Sharada
Nirosha 
Jaggayya 
Mallikarjuna Rao as Jantar Mantar
Sakshi Ranga Rao
Rallapalli
Prasad Babu
Krishna Bhagavan
Jayalalita
Sivaji Raja
Y. Vijaya
Sandhya Rani
Kaikala Satyanarayana

Soundtrack
Music is released on LEO Audio Company.

References

External links
 

1992 films
1990s Telugu-language films
Films scored by Ilaiyaraaja
Indian comedy-drama films
Films directed by Vamsy
1992 comedy-drama films